On 4 October 2022, an avalanche hit the Draupadi Ka Danda peak in Uttarakhand, India. 27 mountaineers in the Advanced Mountaineering Course of the Nehru Institute of Mountaineering were killed as a result. The death toll makes this the worst mountaineering disaster recorded in India.

References 

2022 in India
2022 natural disasters
2020s avalanches
2022 disasters in India
October 2022 events in India
Mountaineering disasters